Carbosilanes are organosilicon compounds where the structures feature alternating silicon and carbon atoms, i.e., Si-C-Si-C linkages.  They represent molecular analogues of silicon carbide. The compounds exploit the tendency of both carbon and silicon to form tetrahedral structures. The inventory of carbosilanes is large.

Synthesis and structure
The compounds originally were obtained as products of the pyrolysis of simple organosilicon precursors such as the methylsilanes.  More efficient precursors contain premade Si-C-Si-C etc. subunits.

References

Carbosilanes